Algimantas Briaunys (born 3 November 1964) is a Lithuanian professional football coach and a former goalkeeper. He played the position of goalkeeper. He won a total of four international caps for the Lithuania national football team.

Coaching career
From 2003 to 2004, Briaunys was manager of FK Atlantas. In 2005, he then worked as goalkeeper coach for FC Flora and later from 2006 to 2008 for FCI Levadia Tallinn. In 2009, Briaunys was appointed manager of Banga Gargždai. He left in 2010 and became assistant manager of FCI Levadia Tallinn in 2011 and later also goalkeeper coach at the club.

At the end of 2011, Briaunys was hired as goalkeeper coach of JK Sillamäe Kalev and in September 2012, he was appointed manager of the club. He left the manager post in April 2013 and continued as goalkeeper coach of the club.

In July 2019, he joined Palanga as assistant manager and in September 2019, he became manager for the rest of the season after the departure of Viačeslavu Geraščenka.

Honours
Flora
Meistriliiga champion: 1993–94, 1994–95
Meistriliiga runner-up: 1995–96
Estonian Cup winner: 1994–95

Žalgiris
A Lyga runner-up: 1996–97, 1997–98
Lithuanian Football Cup winner: 1997

Liepājas Metalurgs
Latvian Higher League runner-up: 1998, 1999
Latvian Higher League bronze: 2000, 2001

Atlantas
A Lyga runner-up: 2002

References

External links

1964 births
People from Sovetsk, Kaliningrad Oblast
Living people
Soviet footballers
FK Atlantas players
FK Sirijus Klaipėda players
Lithuanian footballers
FC Asmaral Moscow players
Lithuanian expatriate footballers
Expatriate footballers in Russia
Lithuanian expatriate sportspeople in Russia
Russian Premier League players
FC Halychyna Drohobych players
Expatriate footballers in Ukraine
Lithuanian expatriate sportspeople in Ukraine
FC Flora players
Expatriate footballers in Estonia
Lithuanian expatriate sportspeople in Estonia
F.C. Copenhagen players
Expatriate men's footballers in Denmark
Lithuanian expatriate sportspeople in Denmark
JK Tervis Pärnu players
FK Žalgiris players
FK Liepājas Metalurgs players
Expatriate footballers in Latvia
Lithuanian expatriate sportspeople in Latvia
Lithuania international footballers
Lithuanian football managers
Lithuanian expatriate football managers
Expatriate football managers in Russia
JK Sillamäe Kalev managers
Expatriate football managers in Estonia
Association football goalkeepers
Meistriliiga players